High Flying Songs of Tang Dynasty, also known as Da Tang Ge Fei, is a Chinese television series based on the romance between the Tang dynasty singer-dancer Xu Hezi (许合子) and her lover Yin Menghe (尹梦荷), as well as a fictitious account of their involvement in the events in the reign of Emperor Xuanzong. Starring Ma Su and Jia Nailiang as the couple, the series was first aired on CCTV-8 in mainland China on 20 September 2003.

Plot
Xu Hezi, a talented singer-dancer from Yongxin, Jiangxi, is in love with her childhood friend, the scholar Yin Menghe. However, she is forcefully taken away by the local authorities and sent to the palace in Chang'an. Not long after joining the imperial harem, she becomes embroiled in a power struggle between Consort Mei and Imperial Consort Yang. She wishes to leave the palace for good, but fate leads her to Emperor Xuanzong, who is so enchanted by her singing that he grants her the title of "Singing Consort".

In the meantime, Yin Menghe and his younger brother, Yin Mengyun, have followed Xu Hezi to Chang'an but they cannot enter the palace. To reunite with his beloved, Yin Menghe has no choice but to cooperate with the crafty chancellor Yang Guozhong. Xu Hezi and Yin Menghe encounter several tests of their love but they always remain faithful to each other. They managed to touch the hearts of many, including the poet Li Bai, A'feng and Princess Mudan.

The crown prince, Li Heng, appears to be meek and humble but is actually a highly ambitious individual. He makes use of Xu Hezi to threaten Yin Menghe and force him to work with the general An Lushan. When An Lushan starts a rebellion against the Tang dynasty, Emperor Xuanzong flees from Chang'an and Li Heng seizes the opportunity to take his father's throne. After becoming the emperor, Li Heng intends to kill Yin Menghe in order to silence the latter but Yin Mengyun sacrifices himself to save his brother and ensure that his brother can be together with Xu Hezi.

Cast
 Ma Su as Xu Hezi
 Jia Nailiang as Yin Menghe
 Tang Guoqiang as Emperor Xuanzong of Tang
 Sun Haiying as Li Bai
 Lü Liping as Consort Mei
 Wang Luyao as Imperial Consort Yang
 Nie Yuan as An Qingxu
 Miao Yiyi as Shucai
 Wang Xiaoying as Gao Lishi
 Zhao Kai as Li Heng
 Wang Yu as Yang Guozhong
 Zhao Minjie as He Zhizhang
 Chi Jia as Yin Mengyun
 Bao Depan as An Lushan
 Xu Zhen as Wei Qing
 Liu Xiaoxiao as Hu Lai
 Wu Jiaojiao as Xiaoyu
 Liu Yuanyuan as Princess Mudan
 Liu Jing as A'feng
 Hua Dong as Jiu Popo
 Jia Mingling as Yincishi
 Mu Jing as Moju
 Xiao Wen as Ruyi
 Xiaosi as A'bing

List of featured songs
 Hongyan Lei (红颜泪; Beauties' Tears), the opening theme song, performed by Fei Yu-ching.
 Da Tang Ge Fei (大唐歌飞; High Flying Songs of Tang Dynasty), the ending theme song, performed by Wang Luyao.
 Da Zhi Shan Ge (打支山歌; Sing a Song of Mountains)  performed by Jin Shan, Liu Xiang, Zhang Ai and Pan Huili.
 Yi Zhen Chunfeng / Wang Lang Diao (一阵春风 / 望郎调; / A Gust of Spring Wind / Tune of Gazing at My Lover)  performed by Jin Shan, Liu Xiang, Zhang Ai and Pan Huili.
 Yao Chang Shange Suan Wo Duo (要唱山歌算我多; Who Sings More Songs of Mountains Than Me) performed by Jin Shan, Liu Xiang, Zhang Ai and Pan Huili.
 Qingping Diao (清平调; Tune of Serenity) performed by Liu Xiang and Pan Huili.
 Chang'an Yi Pian Yue (长安一片月; Chang'an is Like the Moon) performed by Liu Xiang and Pan Huili.
 Huang Yun Cheng Bian (黄云城边; Beside the City of Yellow Clouds) performed by Liu Xiang and Pan Huili.
 Ziye Wu Ge / Qiu Ge (子夜吴歌 / 秋歌; Midnight Song of Wu / Autumn Song) performed by Liu Xiang and Pan Huili.

External links
  High Flying Songs of Tang Dynasty on Sina.com

2003 Chinese television series debuts
Television series set in the Tang dynasty
Mandarin-language television shows
Chinese historical television series